Jacques Bridou (born 8 October 1911; died 1953) was a French bobsledder who competed in the 1930s. He won a bronze medal in the four-man event at the 1934 FIBT World Championships in Garmisch-Partenkirchen.

Bridou also competed at the 1936 Winter Olympics in Garmisch-Partenkirchen, finishing ninth in the four-man and 14th in the two-man events.

References
1936 bobsleigh two-man results
1936 bobsleigh four-man results
Bobsleigh four-man world championship medalists since 1930
Bridou's profile at Sports Reference.com

1911 births
1953 deaths

Bobsledders at the 1936 Winter Olympics

French male bobsledders
Olympic bobsledders of France